The Loire 130 was a French flying boat that saw service during World War II. It was designed and built by Loire Aviation of St Nazaire.

Development
The Loire 130 originated from a mid-1930s requirement from the French Navy for a reconnaissance seaplane or flying boat that could also serve aboard French battleships and cruisers. Chosen in 1936 against five competitors (Bréguet 610, Gourdou-Leseurre GL-820 HY, Levasseur PL.200, Potez CAMS 120), the Loire 130's performance was deemed to be good and production orders for 150 of the machines were placed. It entered production in 1937 and replaced most shipborne seaplanes and flying boats already in service.

Operational service
In the late 1930s, Loire 130s were serving aboard most battleships and cruisers of the French Navy, as well as aboard the seaplane tender Commandant Teste. Although appearing quite obsolete and having very marginal performance for their time, quite a few Loire 130s survived the war and remained in post-war French service, especially in French colonies until 1951.

Variants
Loire 130 M 
Production version.
Loire 130 Cl
Colonial variant with enlarged radiator and Hispano-Suiza 12Ycrs

Operators

French Air Force
French Navy

Specifications (Loire 130 M)

See also

References

Bibliography
Bousquet, Gérard. French Flying Boats of WW II. Sandomierz, Poland: Stratus, 2013 
Green, William (1962). War Planes of the Second World War: Volume Five Flying Boats. Macdonald:London. 
Morareau, Lucien (2002). Les aéronefs de l'aviation maritime (1910–1942). ARDHAN,

External links

photo in internet
photo in internet
photo in internet
photo in internet

130
1930s French military reconnaissance aircraft
Flying boats
High-wing aircraft
Single-engined pusher aircraft
Aircraft first flown in 1934